West's Meadow, Aldermaston is a  biological Site of Special Scientific Interest  south of Aldermaston in Berkshire.

The site consists of two fields bounded by hedgerows and a small stream. It  has been managed by grazing since the 1950s.

The site is private land with no public access.

Flora
The site has the following flora:

Trees
Oak
Crataegus
holly
Rowan
Hazel
Willow
Ulmus procera
Prunus avium
Malus sylvestris
Willow
Ulmus procera

Plants

References

Sites of Special Scientific Interest in Berkshire